These are the official results of the Men's 100 metres event at the 1993 IAAF World Championships in Stuttgart, Germany. There were a total number of 70 participating athletes, with nine qualifying heats and the final held on Sunday 1993-08-15.

At 33 years, 135 days old, Linford Christie became the oldest ever world champion for the men's 100 m.

Final

Semifinals
Held on Sunday 1993-08-15

Quarterfinals
Held on Saturday 1993-08-14

Qualifying heats
Held on Saturday 1993-08-14

See also
 1992 Men's Olympic 100 metres

References

 Results

 
100 metres at the World Athletics Championships